Bo'ame is an ancient town in the eastern Sool region. Somaliland has effective control there since 2022, but Puntland also has a territorial claim. It is the capital of Bo'ame district which includes the small towns of Karin-gorfood, Fardhidin, Dan-Gudban, Caleeli, Buura-wadal and Garaca Dacare and Biriqodayaga.

Bo'ame is a commercial centre for the largely agricultural district. Bo'ame has a business relationship to many cities such as Garowe, the administrative capital of Puntland, Galkacyo, Bosasso and Las Anod, the capital of Sool.

Recent History
In early 1993, the Dhulbahante clan held a reconciliation meeting in Bo'ame (Boocame I). Dhulbahante, who lives in Kenya, participated in the meeting. On this occasion, many participants opposed the secession of Somaliland. However, they sent a delegation of 50 people to the 2nd National Somaliland Conference, which was being held in Borama. After discussions, the Dhulbahante clan decided to create its own council to provide autonomy. At the end of 1996, a second meeting (Boocame II) was held in Bo'ame, and with the help of the diaspora, they resolved to oppose Somaliland. This was one of the foundations for the establishment of Puntland.

In January 2012, the Dhulbahante clan declared the establishment of the Khatumo State and sought to capture Las Anod and other areas, but were defeated in a battle with the Somaliland army on April 1, and retreated to Taleh, Xudun, and Bo'ame.

In October 2012, Puntland Election Commission visits Bo'ame.

In February 2013, Xayle Xasan Shire, district director of Bo'ame, said that Al-Shabaab had invaded the Bo'ame rural district pretending to be clerics and that Puntland forces had begun guarding nearby roads.

In December 2013, Bo'ame elder Ugaas Cabdullaahi Ciise announced that Bo'ame is part of the Khatumo state.

In May 2015, Puntland's Ministry of Education visited the educational situation in Bo'ame district.

In November 2016, a drought hit the Bo'ame district.

In January 2018, Xayle Xasan Shire, the district director of Bo'ame, denied rumors of the arrival of Somaliland troops in Bo'ame and stated that Bo'ame is part of Puntland. Xayle Xasan Shire explained in May that "residents are protesting the invasion of Somaliland."

In October 2020, troops deployed as the Puntland Force announced their participation in Somaliland.

In November 2020, a delegation led by Aviation Minister Puntland visited Bo'ame. They made an inspection tour for water projects in this region.

In January 2021, parliamentary polls were held across Somaliland, but no elections were held in Bo'ame.

On February 26, 2021, Demonstrations in support of the outgoing president of the Federal Government of Somalia in Bo'ame.

End of February 2021, Puntland's Home Secretary announced that a local council will be established in the Boerme district.

In early August 2021, the elders of Bo'ame denied reports that the reconciliation agreement between Saax-maygaag and Sange-jebiye had been broken. At the end of August, a deadly battle broke out in Finley village, between Birta-Dheer and Bo'ame.

In January 2022, Puntland vice-president Ahmed Elmi Osman visited Bo'ame and met with Saax-maygaag elders. Ahmed Elmi Osman said he would not return to Garowe, the capital of Puntland, until the conflict between Saax-maygaag and Sange jebiye was resolved.

On May 18, 2022, Somaliland National Army reportedly captured Bo'ame. In June 2022, the Somaliland government accused Puntland of promoting war in the Bo'ame region. According to Somaliland's Minister of Information, the Puntland Army has troops stationed in Galalab in Bo'ame district. On June 23, Puntland elevated Bo'ame's administrative classification from "C" to "B".

On November 1, 2022, Somaliland forces occupied the Bo'ame area with military vehicles equipped with heavy weapons and built a military base.

Demographics
The City of Bo'ame is primarily inhabited by the Dhulbahante clan, with the Hassan Ugaas and other Ugaasyo lineages well represented.

References

Populated places in Sool, Somaliland